Hugh Aiken House is a historic home located at Greenville, South Carolina. It was designed in 1948, by noted Greenville architect William Riddle Ward and built in 1952. It is a -story frame residence in the Colonial Revival style. A large, tapered stone chimney dominates the front elevation of the house. The property features an extensively landscaped lot that is a heavily wooded, natural setting with falling topography and natural springs.

It was added to the National Register of Historic Places in 2003.

References

Houses on the National Register of Historic Places in South Carolina
Colonial Revival architecture in South Carolina
Houses completed in 1952
Houses in Greenville, South Carolina
National Register of Historic Places in Greenville, South Carolina